Implicit attitudes are evaluations that occur without conscious awareness towards an attitude object or the self. These evaluations are generally either favorable or unfavorable and come about from various influences in the individual experience. The commonly used definition of implicit attitude within cognitive and social psychology comes from Anthony Greenwald and Mahzarin Banaji's template for definitions of terms related to implicit cognition: "Implicit attitudes are introspectively unidentified (or inaccurately identified) traces of past experience that mediate favorable or unfavorable feeling, thought, or action toward social objects". These thoughts, feelings or actions have an influence on behavior that the individual may not be aware of.

An attitude is differentiated from the concept of a stereotype in that it functions as a broad favorable or unfavorable characteristic towards a social object, whereas a stereotype is a set of favorable and/or unfavorable characteristics which are applied to an individual based on social group membership.

Causes and manifestations 
A number of different theories have been proposed relating to the formation, development, and influence of implicit attitudes.

Halo effect 

Based on many empirical findings, Greenwald and Banaji et al. (1995) generated the fundamental idea of implicit attitude definitively for the first time, disambiguating attitude into explicit and implicit types. Halo effects are an example of the empirical research used by Greenwald and Banaji in their chapter on implicit social cognition. Understanding halo effects set the foundation for understanding other theories regarding implicit attitudes. For example, it is possible to explain implicit partisanship or implicit egotism in terms of a halo effect, however these concepts will be discussed more in subsequent sections.

Pioneered by Edward Thorndike in 1920, the halo effect is the judgement of attribute "A" being influenced by a known but irrelevant attribute "B". For example, subsequent replications commonly use physical attractiveness as attribute "B" and attribute "A" being a judgement of the subject. More specifically a study Landy and Sigall et al. (1974) found that essays written by female essayists were found to be of higher quality when a photo showed the essayist as being attractive (rather than unattractive) when rated by male judges.

Greenwald and Banaji et al. (1995) have suggested that attribute "B" is in fact an implicit attitude when the judge or subject cannot identify attribute "B" as the source of the judgement for attribute "A". Moreover, when attribute "B" is associated with a positive or negative attitude and additionally is unknowingly and automatically transferred onto attribute "A", that attitude of attribute "B" is known to be an implicit attitude.

Experiences and socialization 
Earlier research findings on implicit attitudes show that socialization and reflections of past experiences may be responsible for the development or manifestation of longer lasting implicit attitudes. As an example, Rudman and Goodwin et al. found in 2004 that individuals who were primarily raised by their mothers showed a more positive implicit attitude towards women rather than men. Furthermore, Olson and Fazio et al. in 2001 and 2002 suggested that these implicit attitudes are a result of repeated pairings of positive or negative stimuli with an object; more pairings of positive stimuli would result in a more positive implicit attitude and vice versa. This finding supports the fundamental principles of classical conditioning.

Implicit attitudes are also developed by more recent experiences as well. For example, Rudmore, Ashmore, & Gary et al. in 2001 found that implicit attitude of prejudice against African Americans could be shaped through diversity training intervention using variables at an emotional level rather than increased awareness of bias which helped explicit attitude more.

Implicit attitudes related to the self 
Self-related objects are anything that pertains to the self; including in-groups and self-esteem (attitude towards the self).

Early research by Nuttin et al. in 1985 suggested that people generally have an implicit preference for letters in their own name, known as the Name letter effect. Further replications of this same effect with varying independent variables (e.g., attractiveness to people with the same letters contained in their names) suggest that people have an implicit preference towards themselves. This manifestation of implicit attitude has come to be known as Implicit egotism. Implicit egotism additionally manifests itself in in-groups.

Implicit partisanship is the heightened attractiveness and identification to a self-related group and negative or neutral attitudes towards non-self-related groups. Greenwald, Pickrell, and Farnham et al. demonstrated this effect in 2002, even when the groups were cooperative and when the members of the groups were non-human. Much of the research on implicit partisanship suggests that this is an uncontrollable process, or an implicit attitude towards self-related groups.

Culture and social norms 
Generally speaking, culture and social norms have an effect on implicit attitude in the same way experiences and socialization have an effect on implicit attitude. However, culture has a very noticeable effect on implicit attitude in the way implicit attitude differs from one's explicit attitude. In 2002, Livingston et al. examined the effect of mainstream culture on one's implicit attitude towards their social group. Implicitly, one will follow the cultural attitudes towards their social group that they perceive from mainstream culture in their society whether that be positive or negative. With that said, a strong cultural disadvantage (e.g., negative attitude) can effectively eliminate in-group favoritism when tested at the implicit level. However it may be important to note that at the explicit attitude level, these individuals still showed positive attitudes towards their social group. Olson and Fazio et al. suggested in 2004 that at an implicit level one's personal attitude can be influenced by the social or cultural norms that one perceives. Furthermore, this may be due to a weak distinction between one's personal attitude and extrapersonal associations (e.g., one's cultural evaluations) towards an attitude object at the implicit level. Therefore, implicit attitudes are reflective of experiences but can also be shaped by the cultural context.

Degree of awareness 
Current research supports the idea that there are three different aspects of attitudes captured by current indirect measures that could be outside of conscious awareness: the source, the content, and the impact of an attitude. Source awareness is described as the "awareness of the origin of a particular attitude" (emphasis added). Content awareness is differentiated from source awareness by the lack of awareness about the attitude, rather than simply its origin. Finally, one may have awareness of both the attitude and its source but the attitude may still have influences on thought or behavior beyond ones awareness; this can be thought of as impact awareness.  Conclusions have been made that both indirectly assessed and self-reported attitudes can be characterized by lack of source awareness, there is no evidence for lack of content awareness of indirectly assessed attitudes, and there is some evidence showing that indirectly assessed, but not self-reported, attitudes can be characterized by lack of impact awareness. The most compelling evidence for content awareness of implicit attitudes has showed that people are highly accurate in predicting their scores on the Implicit Association Test.

Flexibility 
Recent research indicates the possibility of the malleability of implicit attitudes based on situational context. That is, implicit attitudes are not believed to be stable representations of memory, rather they are constructed based on the type of available information in a given situation. Available information can vary in context to the individual, though it is believed to serve as a prime to their behaviors. Flexibility of implicit attitudes is best demonstrated through measures that include accessibility effects. For example, it has been demonstrated that the information given to an individual prior to completing an implicit measure directly affects their response based on the information they were given. Therefore, if an individual is primed with information regarding the positive, or negative, attributions of a different race and then asked to complete an implicit measures task, the participants will most likely use the information that was presented during the prime and not their own experienced information to assess the situation. This occurs because the information that was primed is most available for the participant to access without having to use conscious resources.

Effects on behavior 
The fundamental goal of measuring implicit attitudes is to use it to predict behavior; behaviors that can't be predicted by knowledge of explicitly held attitudes. Numerous studies, such as research conducted by Chen and Bargh in 1999, show that automatic evaluations triggered by various attitudes towards objects directly affected behavioral predispositions towards that object. Stimuli that elicited positive attitudes produced immediate positive behavior whilst stimuli that elicited negative attitudes triggered immediate avoidance behavior. The individuals are completely unaware of the operations that their behavioral responses because they are automatic and unconscious. In Bassenoff and Sherman et al. (2000) they found that automatic negative attitudes about overweight individuals directly predicted how far participants choose to sit from a fat woman, who they were expected to interact with. We see this phenomenon also with implicitly held racial attitudes as shown by McConnell and Leibold et al. (2001). These implicit attitudes affected how long they interacted for, how much participants smiled, how many speech errors they made and how many social comments were made. All automatic behavioral responses that measuring explicit attitudes could not predict.

Types of behavior affected by implicit attitudes 
Implicit attitudes aren't always better at predicting behavior than explicit measurements, they both play a systematic role in predicting behavior. Implicit attitudes are typically better than explicit attitudes at predicting behavior that is automatic and spontaneous. In line with Dual process theories such as Fazio's MODE model, automatic attitudes determine spontaneous actions, whereas deliberative actions reflect a contribution of multiple processes, including more controlled processes (e.g., a person's motivation to overcome prejudiced responses). As demonstrated by Dasgupta an Rivera et al. (2006), individuals who endorsed traditional beliefs about gender and sexuality were friendlier towards gay confederates verbally but showed negative non-verbal behavior, this suggested that this individuals were consciously over-correcting their behavior but their prejudice leaked out through automatic responses like blinking and eye contact.

Effects of motivation 
Although, research has shown that motivation and an opportunity to react carefully can affect how much implicit attitudes influence behavioral response. When individuals are highly motivated to control their responses and processing abilities are not lacking or preoccupied, behavioral responses tend to reflect intentional processes. In 2003, Towles-schwen and Fazio measured anticipated willingness and discomfort of participants to interact with a black person. Individuals who were motivated to avoid interracial conflicts and where not concerned about seeming biased expressed their discomfort; whereas individuals who were concerned about not appearing biased reported less anticipated discomfort, in an attempt to hide their prejudice. Motivation to control our responses can minimize the influence of implicit attitudes on behavioral responses as shown by that example.

Measurement 
There is an assortment of different experimental tests that assess for the presence of implicit attitudes, including the implicit association test, evaluative and semantic priming tasks, the Extrinsic Affective Simon Task, Go/No-Go Association Task, and the Affect Misattribution Procedure. Though these tests vary in administration, and content, the basis of each is to "allow investigators to capture attitudes that individuals are unwilling to report."  Unwillingness and lack of ability are intertwined considering most individuals are unaware that these attitudes even exist. The following are brief descriptions about these measurements, which are most commonly used to assess implicit attitudes, and the empirical evidence that supports them.

Implicit Association Test 

The Implicit Association Test is a latency-based measure of the relative associations between two concepts.  In a series of tasks, participants sort words or images representing a target concept such as race (white/black) and stimuli with known positive/negative valence into two categories (usually indicated by right or left location on a computer screen).  Each category of concept words or images is paired with both positive and negative stimuli. The faster the categorization occurs, the stronger the association is between words and/or images that are grouped together (ex. faster categorization of dogs when paired with positive rather than negative words), which would indicate an implicit attitude towards that object. A full demonstration of the IAT procedure can be found at the Project Implicit link and the IAT Inquisit link below.

Research using the IAT measure of implicit attitudes has demonstrated consistent experimental and population-based attitudes with respect to concepts such as gender, race, and age.  An analysis from the Project Implicit database found that science-gender stereotypes are predictive of differences in gender related math and science performance across countries in an international sample. Research has also successfully used the IAT in consumer research. Implicit attitude also directly drives the use of information systems and serves as a basis upon which use habit is formed.

Evaluative priming task 

Research using the evaluative priming task has been frequently used in research on eating and attitudes towards food.  In clinical studies, the procedure was used to study attitudes of those diagnosed with eating disorders such as anorexia nervosa. Along with many of the other methods presented here, researchers have used the procedure to measure the effects of stereotypes, including measurement of the effectiveness of stereotype reduction treatments.

Semantic priming task 

In the semantic priming task paradigm described by Wittenbrink et al. (1997), participants are shown a word prime at intervals which are too brief for reported awareness (see subliminal stimuli).  The word prime consists of two groups of words representing the concept in question (such as black sounding names or white sounding names). Participants were then asked to complete a lexical decision task (LDT) to identify if target stimuli are words or a non-words. The target stimuli consist of words with known positive or negative valence.  When words with positive valence are categorized more quickly in the presence of one group of word primes (such as black sounding names), this indicates positive attitudes towards the group.

Extrinsic Affective Simon Task (EAST) 

In the Extrinsic Affective Simon Task (EAST), participants categorized stimuli which consisted of words that either had positive or negative valence that were presented in either the color white or two different colors.  When the words are presented in white, participants categorize based words on their perceived positive or negative valence.  When the words are presented in color, participants are asked to categorize based on color alone and ignore word meaning.  When colored words are presented, categorization accuracy and speed are facilitated when, for words which the respondent has a positive implicit attitude, the response was the same as was expected for white words with obvious positive valence. A full demonstration of the EAST procedure can be found in the external links below.

The EAST has been used in research of attitudes of those who have specific phobias and/or anxiety. Additionally, the test has been recently used to measure implicit attitudes towards alcohol in populations who have substance abuse problems; and the test has been cited as having relatively high predictive value for problem substance use.

Go/No-go Association Task (GNAT) 

In practice, the GNAT appears similar to the Implicit Association Test in that participants are asked to categorize targets representing either a concept (such as race; ex. white or black names) or words which have obvious positive or negative valence. Participants are asked to respond ('go') or decline to respond ('no-go') during a short interval after each of the stimuli are presented.  In test trials, participants are asked to respond to one of the concepts (white or black) and words with either positive or negative valence; these are then switched so that the concept is then paired with the opposite valence category.  When paired with words with positive valence, faster and more accurate responding indicates greater association, and therefore positive attitude towards the target concept (either white or black race). A full demonstration of the GNAT procedure can be found in the external links below.

Like the EAST, the GNAT has been used in populations who have been diagnosed with acute phobias to measure fear associations in addition to research on stereotypes and discrimination.

Affect Misattribution Procedure (AMP) 

The Affect Misattribution Procedure relies on participant ratings of neutral stimuli as an indirect measure of implicit attitudes rather than latency or accuracy measures.  In the procedure, participants are first presented with a stimulus (usually an image or word), for either a brief visible period or subliminally, which is suspected to elicit a positive or negative attitude.  Directly afterwards, participants are presented with a neutral stimulus (most often a Chinese pictograph) which they are asked to rate as either more or less, in this case visually, pleasing than an average stimulus.  During these trials, the positive or negative affect in response to the priming image is misattributed or 'projected' onto the neutral stimulus such that it is rated as more or less pleasing than would be expected from solitary presentation.  Neutral stimuli which are rated as more visually pleasing indicate that the preceding concept presented in the prime stimuli are associated with positive valence. A full demonstration of the AMP procedure can be found in the external links below.

The AMP has been used to study attitudes towards political candidates and has proven useful in predicting voting behavior. Also, the procedure is frequently used in the study of substance use; for example, attitudes towards cigarettes among smokers and non-smokers and attitudes towards alcohol among heavy drinkers. It has also been used to measure implicit bias against minority groups.

Comparison with explicit attitudes

Interaction of implicit and explicit attitude 
The following are some examples of how implicit attitude and explicit attitude are moderated by each other and how they interact with each other.

Self presentation 
Individuals will alter a response when questioned for personal or social purposes. This typically happens in situations where individuals are not willing to report or express their "affective response toward an object" because they don't want others to know how they feel about something (they don't consciously accept or endorse their evaluation). Since implicit measures are not as vulnerable to control as explicit measures are, the correlation between implicit and explicit attitudes should decrease as self presentation concerns increase. For example, in 2005 Nosek found that there was more overlap in explicit and implicit measures when people rated Pepsi vs. Coca-Cola (low self presentation concern). However, when they rated thin vs. fat people (high self presentation concern), the correlation (or overlap) of implicit and explicit measure decreased.

Attitude strength 
The strength of an attitude has an influence on explicit attitudes the stronger an implicit attitude the more likely it is that it will show up in an explicit attitude. Strong attitudes are stable and not easily changed due to persuasion and can therefore help predict behaviors. The more an individual expresses or acts on an attitude the stronger the attitude becomes and the more automated the attitude becomes. Attitude strength should increase the correspondence between implicit and explicit attitudes. Conscious thinking about the attitude should create more of an overlap between both implicit and explicit attitude.

Early focus on explicit attitudes 
Much of the literature within the field of social psychology has focused on explicit constructions of the attitude construct.  Until more recently, examination of attitudes beyond reported awareness has lagged far behind that of explicit attitudes.  This point is driven home in a review of research in the mid-1990s which found that among attitudinal research published in 1989, approximately only 1 in 9 experimental paradigms utilized an indirect measure of attitude (necessary for determining contributions of implicit attitudes) while all of the reviewed studies employed direct measures such as self report of attitudes which were explicitly aware to participants.

New ideas about implicit versus explicit attitudes 
Newer research has called into question the distinction between implicit and explicit attitudes. Fazio & Olson ask whether a person who is being primed to detect implicit attitudes is necessarily blind to their implicit beliefs.  In their paper they bring up the question; just because a person is primed on an unconscious level and may indeed be answering on an unconscious level, does that not mean that they could still be aware of their attitudes nonetheless. "A second troublesome aspect of the implicit-explicit distinction is that it implies preexisting dual attitudes". They go on to say there is not a known test capable of measuring explicit attitudes solely without the influence of implicit attitudes as well. However, they do go on to say that context can have a significant effect on this particular line of research. People's explicitly stated and implicitly tested attitudes are more likely to be in sync for trivial matters such as preference in a presidential election than for highly charged issues such as predispositions towards a certain race. They exert that "The more sensitive the domain, the greater the likelihood that motivational factors will be evoked and exert some influence on overt responses to an explicit measure". In other words, it is easier to compare explicit and implicit attitudes on safe subjects than subjects where people are likely to mask their beliefs.

A prominent dual process theory specifying the relation between implicit and explicit attitudes is Gawronski and Bodenhausen's associative-propositional evaluation (APE) model. A central assumption of the APE model is that implicit and explicit evaluations are the product of two functionally distinct mental processes. Whereas implicit evaluations are assumed to be the outcome of associative processes, explicit evaluations are assumed to be the outcome of propositional processes. Associative processes are conceptualized as the activation of associations on the basis of feature similarity and spatio-temporal contiguity during learning. Propositional processes are defined as the validation of activated information on the basis of cognitive consistency. A central assumption of the APE model is that people tend to rely on their implicit evaluations when making explicit evaluative judgments to the extent that the implicit evaluative response is consistent with other momentarily considered propositional information. However, people may reject implicit evaluations for making explicit evaluative judgments when the implicit evaluative response is inconsistent with other momentarily considered propositional information. In addition to explaining the relation between implicit and explicit evaluations, the APE model accounts for diverging patterns of attitude change, including:
 changes in implicit but not explicit evaluations
 changes in explicit but not implicit evaluations
 corresponding changes in implicit and explicit evaluations
 opposite changes in implicit and explicit evaluations.

See also

References 

Psychological attitude
Conceptions of self
Ignorance